The Royal Society Rosalind Franklin Award was established in 2003 and is awarded annually by the Royal Society to an individual for outstanding work in any field of Science, technology, engineering, and mathematics (STEM) and to support the promotion of women in STEM. It is named in honour of Rosalind Franklin and initially funded by the Department of Trade and Industry (DTI) and subsequently the Department for Innovation, Universities and Skills (DIUS) as part of its efforts to promote women in STEM. Women are a significantly underrepresented group in STEM making up less than 9% of the United Kingdom's full-time and part-time Professors in Science. The award consists of a medal and a grant of £30,000, and the recipient delivers a lecture as part of the Society's public lecture series, some of which are available on YouTube.

Laureates 
 2003: Susan Gibson on Make me a molecule. Awarded presented by Patricia Hewitt, serving Minister for Women and Equalities.
 2004: Carol V. Robinson on Finding the right balance.
 2005: Christine Davies on  The quandary of the quark.
 2006: Andrea Brand on Constructing a nervous system: stem cells to synapses
 2007: Ottoline Leyser on Thinking like a vegetable: how plants decide what to do
 2008: Eleanor Maguire on Mapping memory: the brains behind remembering
 2009: Sunetra Gupta on Surviving pandemics: a pathogen's perspective
 2010: Katherine Blundell on Black holes and spin offs
 2011: Francesca Happé on When will we understand Autism Spectrum Disorders?
 2012: Polly Arnold on Extracting value from waste through a little chemistry with U
 2013: Sarah-Jayne Blakemore for her scientific achievements
 2014: Rachel McKendry  for her scientific achievement.
 2015: Lucy Carpenter for her scientific achievement and her suitability as a role model
 2016: Jo Dunkley for her research in the cosmic microwave background and her innovative project to support and encourage girls studying physics.
 2017: Essi Viding for her achievements in the field of experimental psychology
 2018: Tamsin Mather for her work in the field of volcanology
 2019: Nguyen TK Thanh for her work in nanotechnology
 2020: Julia Gog for her achievements in the field of mathematics and her impactful project proposal with its potential for a long-term legacy.
 2021: Suzanne Imber for her achievements in the field of planetary science and her well-considered project proposal with a potential for a high impact
 2022: Diane Saunders for "her innovative mentoring and training project to support and empower undergraduates and early-career female researchers in plant sciences at postgraduate and postdoctoral levels".

Rosalind Franklin Award Committee 
 the Rosalind Franklin award committee (which takes the decision on the prize each year) includes:

 Frances Ashcroft
 Edward Hinds
 Lucy Carpenter
 Thomas James Simpson
 Frances Kirwan
 Eric Priest

References 

Awards established in 2003
Awards of the Royal Society
2003 in science
Science awards honoring women